All Pigs Must Die is an American metalcore supergroup consisting of Kevin Baker of The Hope Conspiracy, Ben Koller of Converge, Adam Wentworth and Matt Woods of Bloodhorse, and Brian Izzi of Trap Them. All Pigs Must Die is signed to Nonbeliever Records, an imprint label of Shirts & Destroy.

History 
The band's debut EP, which was recorded at Kurt Ballou's GodCity Studio, was released in October 2010. The cover artwork was designed by German illustrator Florian Bertmer.

In December 2010 the band began recording for their second release, again with Kurt Ballou at GodCity Studio. In March 2011, it was announced that their upcoming album would be titled God Is War, and that the band had signed with Southern Lord.

Their second full-length album, Nothing Violates This Nature, was released in 2013.

Members 
 Kevin Baker – vocals
 Adam Wentworth – guitar
 Matt Woods – bass
 Ben Koller – drums
 Brian Izzi – guitar

Discography

Studio albums
God Is War (2011) – Southern Lord
Nothing Violates This Nature (2013) – Southern Lord
Hostage Animal (2017) - Southern Lord

Extended plays
All Pigs Must Die (2010) – Nonbeliever
Curse of Humanity (2012) – Southern Lord

References

External links
Official MySpace
Official Twitter

Heavy metal musical groups from Massachusetts
American crust and d-beat groups
Musical groups established in 2009
2009 establishments in Massachusetts
Hardcore punk groups from Massachusetts
Metalcore musical groups from Massachusetts